NPO 2 (NPO twee, formerly Nederland 2  until 2014) is a Dutch television channel, sister channel of NPO 1 and NPO 3. It was established on 1 October 1964 at 20:00, initially with a 2.5 hours schedule until 22:30.

NPO 2 tends to broadcast arts, culture, politics, news, current affairs, documentaries and religious programmes. In the mornings, NPO 2 simulcasts NPO 1's news bulletins with sign language.

History
Test transmissions started on 4 March 1964. These broadcasts were only received through the IJsselstein-Lopik transmitter. On 1 October 1964, the official broadcasts of Nederland 2 started and the first public broadcasting channel NTS was renamed into Nederland 1. In September 1967, colour broadcasts were introduced on Nederland 2.

After the launch of Nederland 3 in 1988, Nederland 2 became the mainstay channel of the broadcasters AVRO, TROS, VOO/Veronica and VPRO, earning it the nickname ATV. On 30 September 1991, AVRO moved to Nederland 1 whereas VARA moved to this channel. Another restructuring was made on 28 September 1992 when EO moved from Nederland 1 to Nederland 2 and in return, VARA and VPRO moved to Nederland 3. In 1995 VOO/Veronica split from the Netherlands Public Broadcasting to become a commercial channel.

On 16 September 2007 the NPO channels Nederland 1, Nederland 2 and Nederland 3 switched completely to anamorphic widescreen, before that time some of the programming was already broadcast in widescreen.

On 4 July 2009, all three channels began simulcasting in 1080i high-definition. Before the launch of the permanent HD service, a test version of the Nederland 1 HD channel was made available from 2 June 2008 until 24 August 2008 in order to broadcast Euro 2008, the 2008 Tour de France, and the 2008 Summer Olympics in HD.

On 12 March 2013, the NPO announced that Nederland 1, 2 and 3 will be renamed as NPO 1, 2 and 3. The reason for this change is to make the channels and its programmes more recognizable. The rebranding completed on 19 August 2014.

Programming
NPO 2 is aimed at viewers who wish for a more intelligent style of programming. Fixtures of the channel's schedule include:
 Repeats of the week's programmes from across the NPO network (shown on weekdays between 9:10am and 4pm)
 Nieuwsuur, an in-depth current affairs programme broadcast at 10pm every night
 Repeats of the day's current affairs programme overnight (such as Nieuwsuur)

Cultural programmes are generally broadcast during the day on Saturdays, and Sunday mornings are home to religious programmes, such as the BBC's Songs of Praise.

Logos and identities

See also
Television networks in the Netherlands

References

External links
NPO 2 website

Television channels in the Netherlands
Television channels and stations established in 1964
Netherlands Public Broadcasting
Mass media in Hilversum